The Council for Higher Education in Israel (HaMo'atza LeHaskala Gevoha) is a supervisory body for universities and colleges in Israel. It is the only organization with the authority to award academic educational accreditation. The head of the council is always the Minister of Education, and at least two-thirds of its members are academics.

The council is located in Albert Einstein Square, Jerusalem, next to the Israel Academy of Sciences and Humanities.

History
The council was established in 1958, a time at which most of the academic institutions were dependent on the governmental budget, and there was concern among academics that the government would politically influence higher education institutions.

In 1956 the government appointed a special committee, which was supposed to advise the government how to act, in order to assure that no ruling political party will be able to influence the academic institutions. The Governor of the Bank of Israel, David Horowitz, was the head of the committee, which advised the government to appoint a special apolitical and academic council which would supervise the functioning of the academic institutions and their relations with the government. Soon after, in 1958, the Knesset passed the Council for Higher Education Law, which established the organisation.

In December 2005, new legislation came into force, which enlarged the student representation at the council from one to two members, one for university students and one for college students.

Structure and responsibilities
The total budget of the council, which is funded by the government, is 6 billion NIS per year, which is then transferred to the public universities and colleges. Among its duties, the council is responsible for the establishment of new universities and the expansion of existing universities.

The most important body of the council is the committee for budget and planning, which deals with the division of funding between the various universities and colleges.

See also
 List of universities and colleges in Israel

References

External links
 Official website

1958 establishments in Israel
Educational institutions established in 1958
Council for Higher Education in Israel
Education in Israel
School accreditors
Higher education authorities